Cape St. Francis is a village in South Africa, situated on a headland in the Eastern Cape Province. It is popular for its clean beaches and as a surfing location.

The village is home to the Seal Point Lighthouse.

The Irma Booysen Floral Reserve is the home to many species of flowers and plants.

The adjacent village, St Francis Bay, was the site of "ten-million-to-one" surfing waves seen in the 1966 surf/travel documentary, The Endless Summer.

Cape St. Francis is now known as one of the best surfing locations. Given its geological location, it is susceptible to swell year round from large low pressure systems that form between Antarctica and the southern tip of Africa. When large south west swells wrap around Seal Point and the prevailing offshore winds come up, the surfing is world class.

It is also featured in the 2014 film The Perfect Wave, starring Scott Eastwood.

Bartolomeu Dias originally named the cape Ponta das Quiemadas because of the fires he spotted there while sailing past.

See also 
 St. Francis Bay
 Venpet–Venoil collision

References

External links 
Proposed E Cape nuclear plant met with resistance

Surfing locations in South Africa
Beaches of South Africa
Populated coastal places in South Africa
Populated places in the Kouga Local Municipality